Shahrnush Parsipur (born 17 February 1946) is an Iranian-born writer and translator.

Biography
Shahrnush Parsipur was born on 17 February 1946; she was born and raised in Tehran. Parsipur received her B.A. degree in 1973 in sociology from Tehran University, and studied Chinese language and civilization at the Sorbonne from 1976 to 1980.

Her first book was Tupak-e Qermez (The Little Red Ball – 1969), a story for young people. Her first short stories were published in the late 1960s. One early story appeared in Jong-e Isfahan, no. 9 (June 1972), a special short-story issue which also featured stories by Esma'il Fasih, Houshang Golshiri, Taqi Modarresi, Bahram Sadeghi, and Gholam Hossein Saedi. Her novella Tajrobeha-ye Azad (Trial Offers – 1970) was followed by the novel Sag va Zemestan-e Boland (The Dog and the Long Winter), published in 1976. In 1977, she published a volume of short stories called Avizeh'ha-ye Bolur (Crystal Pendant Earrings).

As of the late 1980s, Parsipur received considerable attention in Tehran literary circles, with the publication of several of her stories and several notices and a lengthy interview with her in Donya-ye Sokhan magazine. Her second novel was Touba va ma'na-ye Shab (Touba and the Meaning of Night – 1989), which Parsipur wrote after spending four years and seven months in prison. Right before her incarceration, in 1990, she published a short novel, in the form of connected stories, called Zanan bedun-e Mardan (Women Without Men), which Parsipur had finished in the late 1970s. The first chapter appeared in Alefba, no. 5 (1974). The Iranian government banned Women without Men in the mid-1990s and put pressure on the author to desist from such writing. Early in 1990, Parsipur finished her fourth novel, a 450-page story of a female Don Quixote called Aql-e abirang (Blue-colored Logos), which remained unavailable as of early 1992.

In 1994 she went to the United States and wrote Prison Memoire, 450 pages of her memoire of four different times that she was in different prisons. In 1996 she wrote her fifth novel Shiva, a science fiction in 900 pages. In 1999 she published her sixth novel, Majaraha-ye Sadeh va Kuchak-e Ruh-e Deraxt (The Plain and Small Adventures of the Spirit of the Tree), in 300 pages. In 2002, she published her seventh novel, Bar Bal-e Bad Neshastan (On the Wings of Wind), in 700 pages.

Since 2006, she has been made various programs for Radio Zamaneh based in Amsterdam.

Awards 
Parsipur was the recipient of the prestigious Hellmann Hammett Award for Human Rights in 1994 and was honored in 2003 at the Encyclopædia Iranica Gala in Miami, for her lifelong achievements as a novelist and literary figure, the first recipient of the International Writers Project Fellowship from the Program in Creative Writing and the Watson Institute for International Studies at Brown University for 2003 to 2004, and she received an honorary doctorate from Brown University in 2010.

Personal life 
She was married to the Iranian film director Nasser Taghvai, but the marriage ended in divorce after seven years. They have a son together.

Bibliography

Novels 
 Touba and the Meaning of Night (novel - 1989- طوبی و معنای شب (داستان بلند)
 The Blue Reason (novel - 1994 - عقل آبی (داستان بلند)
 The Simple and Small Adventures of the Spirit of Tree (Novel - 1999 - ماجراهای ساده و کوچک روح درخت (داستان بلند)
 The Dog and the Long Winter (novel - 1974- سگ و زمستان بلند (داستان بلند)
 Asieh Between Two World (novel - 2009 - آسیه در میان دو دنیا (داستان بلند)
 Shiva (science fiction - 1999 - شیوا (داستان دانش)
 Prison Memoir (memoir - 1996) خاطرات زندان
 On the Wings of Wind (novel - 2002) بربال باد نشستن (داستان بلند)

Other works 
 Women Without Men (novella - 1990 - Translations: Faridoun Farrokh زنان بدون مردان (داستانک)
 Trial Offer (novella - 1975 - تجربه های آزاد (داستانک)
 Cristal Pendants (short stories - 1974 - آویزه های بلور (مجموعه داستان)
 Red Ball (short story for children - 1969 - توپک قرمز )
 Tea Ceremony in the Presence of the Wolf (short stories - 1993 - آداب صرف چای در حضور گرگ
 Men from Various Civilizations (novella - 1993 - Translation: Steve MacDowell & Afshin Nassiri داستان های مردان تمدن های مختلف )

Translations 
 Chinese Astrology (1975), by Paola Delsol, from English طالع بینی چینی
 Master Lao Tzu and Taoism (1987), by Max Kaltenmark, from French لائوتزه و مرشدان دائوئی نوشته ماکس کالتنمارک، ترجمه از فرانسه
 Tanius' Cliff (1991), by Amin Maalouf, from French صخره تانیوس نوشته امین مالوف، ترجمه از فرانسه ٌ
 Witch Hunting, (1990), by Shirley Jackson, from English شکار جادوگران شرلی جاکسون، ترجمه از زبان انگلیسی
 History of China (1995), from Opium Wars till Cultural Revolution 4 Volumes, from French تاریخ چین، از جنگ های تریاک تا انقلاب فرهنگی، چهار جلد ترجمه از فرانسه
 China History for Young People (1990), from French تاریخ چین برای نو جوانان، ترجمه از فرانسه
 Parapsychology (1990), from the series "What I Know", from French پیراروانشناسی از سری چه می دانم، ترجمه از فرانسه
 Journey to the West (1995), by Wu Cheng'en, translated from French سیر باختر، رمان، نوشته ووچنگ نن، ترجمه از فرانسه ُ
 Spanking the Maid (2004), by Robert Coover مستخدمه کتک خور، نوشته رابرت کوورو ترجمه از انگلیسی
 An Unquiet Mind (2004), by Kay Redfield Jamison — from English ذهن بی قرار، نوشته کای ردفیلد جامیسون، ترجمه از انگلیسی
 Mythology (2003), by the group of professors of different universities اساطیر جهان، نوشته گروه دانشمندان اسطوره شناس دانشگاه های مختلف دنیا ترجمه از انگلیسی

Translation of her works

Women without Men
Zanan bedun-e Mardan in Persian
 India - Aanungal Illatha Pennungal) translated into Malayalam by S.A. Qudsi and published by Mathrubhumi Books, Calicut, 2005

The book has also a French (translated as Femmes sans hommes), Polish (Kobiety bez mężczyzn), Romanian (Femei fără bărbați), Portuguese, Spanish and Estonian (Meesteta naised) translation.

Tuba and the Meaning of Night
Tuba va Ma'na-ye Shab in Persian

 USA - Touba and the Meaning of Night) translated into English by Kamran Talattof, 2005.
 Poland - Tuba i znaczenie nocy translated into Polish by Anna Krasnowolska, 2012.

The book is also translated into German, Italian and Swedish.

References

Shahrnush Parsipur's biography in BBC Persian
Critics on Shahrnush Parsipur's book
Interview in Hablando del Asunto by Catalina Rossini

External links
Official website
 Feature writer: Shahrnush Parsipur, a series of articles concerning Shahrnush Parsipur written between December 1996 and July 2007, The Iranian, .

Iranian women novelists
Iranian novelists
Iranian women short story writers
Iranian emigrants to the United States
People from Tehran
1946 births
Living people
Faculty of Social Sciences of the University of Tehran alumni